Richard "Richie" Quirke (born 1966) is an Irish Gaelic footballer who played as a full-back for the Tipperary senior team.

Born in Cahir, County Tipperary, Quirke first arrived on the inter-county scene at the age of sixteen when he first linked up with the Tipperary minor team before later joining the under-21 side. Enright joined the senior panel during the 1988 championship while he also played with the Tipperary junior hurling team.

At club level Quirke played with Cahir.

He retired from inter-county football following the conclusion of the 1992 championship.

Honours

Player

Tipperary
All-Ireland Junior Hurling Championship (1): 1989
Munster Junior Hurling Championship (2): 1988, 1989
Munster Minor Football Championship (1): 1984

References

1966 births
Living people
Cahir Gaelic footballers
Cahir hurlers
Tipperary inter-county Gaelic footballers
Tipperary inter-county hurlers